Josep Penuelas or Josep Peñuelas i Reixach (Vic, 1958) is a Catalan ecologist and researcher internationally recognized for his contributions in the fields of ecology and the environment.  He was a student of Ramon Margalef.

His research in the field of global ecology requires high levels of interdisciplinarity: global ecology, global change, climate change, pollution, atmosphere-biosphere, biogenic volatile organic compounds, remote sensing, plant ecophysiology, function and structure of plants and terrestrial ecosystems, chemical ecology, ecometabolomics, microbial ecology, macroecology and evolutionary ecology, biogeochemistry  with a focus on phosphorus, environmental sustainability, food security, and global health.
Included in the Thomson Reuters Highly Cited Researchers list in ecology and environment, plant and animal sciences, agricultural sciences, geosciences, and all fields of science.

National and international recognition 
He has received various distinctions, both national and international (Comte de Barcelona 1990; NASA 1993; Japanese Ministry of Science 1998; Medi Ambient Institut d'Estudis Catalans-Caixa Sabadell 2008; I National Research Award of Catalonia 2010; Silver Badge of the Institut d'Estudis Catalans 2014; Rey Jaime I Award 2015; Dr. Honoris Causa by the Estonian University of Life Sciences, Tartu, Estonia (2016); Adoptive son of Figueres, 2016; President of the jury of the Nature awards for scientific tutoring 2017; Ramon Margalef Award for Ecology from the Generalitat de Catalunya  2016; Special Mention at the Premis Ciutat de Barcelona in the category of Earth and Environmental Sciences 2017; Scientist distinguished by the Chinese Academy of Sciences 2018 and 2022; Marsh Award for Climate Change Research Prize by the British Ecological Society 2018; IV Ramon Muntaner Award for Excellence 2018; Ciutat de Barcelona Prize in Earth and Environmental Sciences 2018; Collegiate of Honor of the Col•legi de Biòlegs de Catalunya 2019; nominated among the four-hundred most influential scientists in all fields and among the ten most influential scientists in ecological and environmental sciences (Meta-Research Innovation Center at Stanford - METRICS) 2019; chosen American Geophysical Union 2020 Fellow for his exceptional contributions in the Earth and space science; his Imbalance-P project project elected between the highlighted 15 examples of how ERC researchers have truly transformed science (among 10,000 ERC grantees); ranked 56th among all researchers in Spain and Spaniards abroad based on the newest Webometrics Ranking 2021; recognized as an Expertscape World Expert in Climatic Processes; most productive ecologist of the world (GlobalauthorID 2021 ranking); 1st position in the ranking of leading ecology and evolution scientists of Spain (Research.com) 2022; Highly cited scientist in ecology/environment, plant and animal sciences, agricultural sciences, geosciences and in all scientific fields of the ISI essential science indicators (since 2016), among many others)). He has been president of the Institució Catalana d'Història Natural (ICHN), advisor to the Consell Assessor per al Desenvolupament Sostenible (CADS) of the Generalitat de Catalunya, member of the Group of experts for the climate emergency (GEC) (Barcelona City Hall) (since 2021) and member of the Group of Experts on Climate Change in Catalonia (since 2009).

External links
 Global Ecology Unit
 ERC Synergy Grant: IMBALANCE-P
 Google Scholar, Citation index

1958 births
Living people
Spanish ecologists
Plant ecologists
Winners of the Ramon Margalef Prize in Ecology